"The Hand That Rocks the Cradle" is a song written by Ted Harris, and recorded by American country music artists Glen Campbell and Steve Wariner.  It was released in May 1987 as the first single from Campbell's album Still Within the Sound of My Voice.  The song reached number 6 on the Billboard Hot Country Singles & Tracks chart.

Chart performance

References

1987 singles
1987 songs
Glen Campbell songs
Steve Wariner songs
Song recordings produced by Jimmy Bowen
MCA Records singles